Hudson Hope Indian Band may refer to:

 Halfway River First Nation before 1971
 West Moberly First Nations before 1971